Barnim is a district in Brandenburg, Germany. It is bounded by (from the east and clockwise) Poland, the district of Märkisch-Oderland, the city state of Berlin and the districts of Oberhavel and Uckermark.

History 
The name "Barnim" emerged in the 13th century and was applied to a large forest region east of the Havel and north of the Spree on the homonymous plateau, where noblemen used to hunt. The present district is roughly identical with, but somewhat smaller than this historical region.

The district was established in 1993 by merging the former districts of Bernau and Eberswalde.

Geography 
Barnim extends from the Oder River to the outskirts of Berlin. The Oder River forms the eastern border. From here the Oder Havel Canal (connecting Oder and Havel) and the historical Finow Canal lead westwards to Eberswalde and beyond. The portions north of these artificial waterways are called Schorfheide. This is a forest region with several large lakes, e.g. Werbellinsee (8 km²), Grimnitzsee (8 km²) and Parsteiner See (10 km²). The Schorfheide is a UNESCO Biosphere Reserve and houses several rare animals like the white-tailed eagle, greater spotted eagle, osprey, black stork, European beaver and Eurasian otter.

Demography

Coat of arms 

The coat of arms of the district resembles the coat of arms of the former district Oberbarnim. The only difference is that the old one had a silver top half and a red bottom half, while the current one is split into four parts and in the right half exchanged red and silver. The eagle in the top half is the eagle of Brandenburg.

Towns and municipalities

References

External links